The phrase ACC Rookie of the Year may refer to:

 Atlantic Coast Conference Men's Basketball Rookie of the Year
 Atlantic Coast Conference Football Rookie of the Year
 Atlantic Coast Conference Men's Soccer Freshman of the Year